Framestore is a British animation and visual effects studio based in Chancery Lane in London. Formed in 1986, it acquired and subsequently merged with the Computer Film Company in 1997. Framestore specialises in effects for film, television, video games, and other media. It is the largest production house within Europe, employing roughly 2500 staff — 1000 in London, and 1500 across offices in Chicago, New York, Los Angeles, Montreal, Vancouver, Mumbai and Beijing.

History

Foundation
Framestore was founded in 1986 by husband and (then) wife William Sargent and Sharon Reed, together with three friends. Tim Webber joined Framestore in 1988 and led the company's push into digital film and television, developing Framestore's virtual camera and motion rig systems. In 1992, Mike Milne started the CGI department, adding computer-generated animation to the company's range of facilities.

Merger with CFC
In 1997, Framestore acquired the Computer Film Company, which was one of the UK's first digital film special effects companies, developing technology for digital film scanning, compositing, and output. CFC was founded in London in 1984 by Mike Boudry, Wolfgang Lempp (now CTO at Filmlight) and Neil Harris (Lightworks). CFC's first film was The Fruit Machine, in 1988, which utilised early morphing techniques.

In 2004, Framestore opened their first satellite office in New York City, to focus on advertising. This was followed by another office in Iceland in 2008, which has since been closed and has reopened as a local VFX company, RVX. In 2013 Framestore opened an office in Montreal, followed by another in Los Angeles the same year. In 2014, it launched a production arm.

Early projects for the company include the delivery of its first feature animation project The Tale of Despereaux with Universal; the completion of Europe's first digital intermediate for the film Chicken Run in 2000; contribution of scenes for the 2009 film Avatar, and the completion as a production project of four British feature films which opened in theatres between during 2009 and 2010.

Acquisition by CIH 
In November 2016, Framestore agreed to let the Shanghai-based Cultural Investment Holdings Co acquire 75% of it for £112.50 million. The company worked on projects such as Fantastic Beasts and Where to Find Them, Beauty and the Beast, and Paddington 2. In April 2017, Framestore opened a third US location, in Chicago, Illinois.

The company also worked on the 2017 film Darkest Hour directed by Joe Wright, working out of the Montreal facility of Framestore to create historically accurate backdrops for 85 shots in the film, including battle scenes.

The team created around 300 shots for the 2017 film Blade Runner 2049, with Framestore winning a special visual effects award at the 2018 British Academy Film Awards. They have also worked on Black Mirror, creating props such as the 60s-style spaceship in the premiere of the fourth season.

Reception 
Framestore has been awarded two Scientific and Technical Academy Awards, and 14 Primetime Emmys. In 2008, Framestore won their first Oscar for Best Visual Effects for the film The Golden Compass; they also won the BAFTA Award for that film the same year. Framestore was also nominated for Oscars in 2009 (The Dark Knight) and again in 2010 (Harry Potter and the Deathly Hallows – Part 1).

Tim Webber was the VFX supervisor on Gravity (2013), and the techniques involved in the film realised by Webber and the Framestore team took three years to complete. The team won the best visual effects awards BAFTA Award for Best Special Visual Effects at the 67th British Academy Film Awards, and the Academy Award for Best Visual Effects award at the 86th Academy Awards. 
 
The company then won both the Academy Award  and BAFTA  for Best Visual Effects in 2018 for its work on Blade Runner 2049.

In advertising the team has also won major awards including Cannes Lions, British Television Advertising Awards, Clios, D&AD and others.

The company's R&D team spun off to create the technology company Filmlight, which in 2010 received four Scientific Academy Awards.

Framestore won the 2020 BAFTA TV Craft Awards for Special, Visual & Graphic Effects for its extensive work on the HBO / BBC series His Dark Materials (TV series).

Advertising and trade characters
Framestore has collaborated with companies and advertising agencies to create trade characters, and also created an attempted photorealistic computer-generated Audrey Hepburn for a Dove chocolate advert. A combination of elements including body doubles, motion capture, FACS and  rendering software called Arnold were used to mimic the appearance of the actress 20 years after her death. The advert drew press attention both for the cutting-edge technology utilized and the ethical implications of using a person's likeness posthumously for commercial purposes.

Film projects

1990s

 Doctor Who - title sequence only
 A Close Shave (1995)
 Cold Lazarus (1996)
 Resident Evil (1996)
 The Adventures of Pinocchio (1996)
 FairyTale: A True Story (1997)
 The Bone Collector (1999)
 The End of the Affair (1999)
 Eyes Wide Shut (1999)
 Notting Hill (1999)
 Sleepy Hollow (1999)
 Walking with Dinosaurs (1999)

2000s 

 The Ballad of Big Al (2000)
 The Beach (2000)
 Cast Away (2000)
 Chicken Run (2000)
 Mission: Impossible 2 (2000)
 Sexy Beast (2000)
 What Lies Beneath (2000)
 The Affair of the Necklace (2001)
 Enemy at the Gates (2001)
 The 51st State (2001)
 Harry Potter and the Philosopher's Stone (2001)
 The Lost World (2001)
 The Mummy Returns (2001)
 Walking with Beasts (2001)
 Blade II (2002)
 Chased by Dinosaurs (2002)
 Die Another Day (2002) - title sequence only
 Dinotopia (2002)
 The Good Thief (2002) & Dirty Pretty Things (2002)
 Harry Potter and the Chamber of Secrets (2002)
 Bright Young Things (2003)
 Cold Mountain (2003)
 Love Actually (2003)
 Sea Monsters (2003)
 Underworld (2003)
 Walking with Cavemen (2003)
 Enduring Love (2004)
 Harry Potter and the Prisoner of Azkaban (2004)
 The Last Dragon (2004)
 Layer Cake (2004)
 Thunderbirds (2004)
 Troy (2004)
 Charlie and the Chocolate Factory (2005)
 The Constant Gardener (2005)
 Doom (2005)
 Harry Potter and the Goblet of Fire (2005)
 The Jacket (2005)
 Nanny McPhee (2005)
 noitulovE (2005)
 The Proposition (2005)
 Sahara (2005)
 V for Vendetta (2005)
 Walking with Monsters (2005)
 Casino Royale (2006)
 Children of Men (2006)
 Goal (2006)
 Ocean Odyssey (2006)
 Prehistoric Park (2006)
 The Queen (2006)
 Superman Returns (2006)
 X-Men: The Last Stand (2006)
 Blood & Chocolate (2007)
 The Golden Compass (2007)
 Harry Potter and the Order of the Phoenix (2007)
 Primeval (2007–11)
 Sea (2007)
 Underdog (2007)
 Australia (2008)
 The Chronicles of Narnia: Prince Caspian (2008)
 The Dark Knight (2008)
 Mamma Mia (2008)
 Quantum of Solace (2008)
 The Tale of Despereaux (2008) - under Framestore Feature Animation
 Wanted (2008)
 Avatar (2009)
 Cheri (2009)
 G.I. Joe: The Rise of Cobra (2009)
 Harry Brown (2009)
 Sherlock Holmes (2009)
 Triangle (2009)
 Where the Wild Things Are (2009)

2010s 

 Coca-Cola Siege advertisement (Super Bowl XLV)
 Clash of the Titans (2010)
 The Chronicles of Narnia: The Voyage of the Dawn Treader (2010)
 Harry Potter and the Deathly Hallows – Part 1 (2010) and Part 2 (2011)
 Nanny McPhee and the Big Bang (2010)
 Prince of Persia: The Sands of Time (2010)
 Salt (2010)
 Captain America: The First Avenger (2011)
 Tinker Tailor Soldier Spy (2011)
 Sherlock Holmes: A Game of Shadows (2011)
 Tower Heist (2011)
 Johnny English Reborn (2011)
 War Horse (2011)
 The Smurfs (2011)
 Tyrannosaur (2011)
 Your Highness (2011)
 Skyfall (2012)
 Wrath of the Titans (2012)
 Gravity (2013)
 We Steal Secrets: The Story of WikiLeaks (2013)
 Iron Man 3 (2013)
 Thor: The Dark World (2013)
 Percy Jackson: Sea of Monsters (2013)
 Hansel & Gretel: Witch Hunters (2013)
 Dracula Untold (2014)
 Edge of Tomorrow (2014)
 Guardians of the Galaxy (2014)
 Paddington (2014)
 Avengers: Age Of Ultron (2015)
 Everest (2015)
 The Martian (2015)
 Pan (2015)
 Doctor Strange (2016)
 The Legend of Tarzan (2016)
 Fantastic Beasts and Where to Find Them (2016)
 Alien: Covenant (2017)
 Beauty and the Beast (2017)
 Blade Runner 2049 (2017)
 Geostorm (2017)
 Guardians of the Galaxy Vol. 2 (2017)
 Kingsman: The Golden Circle (2017)
 Paddington 2 (2017)
 Thor: Ragnarok (2017)
 Avengers: Infinity War (2018)
 Christopher Robin (2018)
 Fantastic Beasts: The Crimes of Grindelwald (2018)
 Mary Poppins Returns (2018)
 Mowgli: Legend of the Jungle (2018)
 Alita: Battle Angel (2019)
 Avengers: Endgame (2019)
 Dumbo (2019)
 Fast & Furious Presents: Hobbs & Shaw (2019)
 Lady and the Tramp (2019)
 Pokémon Detective Pikachu (2019)
 Spider-Man: Far From Home (2019)

2020s 

 Alien Worlds (2020)
 Dolittle (2020)
 Mulan (2020)
 Project Power (2020)
 The Secret Garden (2020)
 The Midnight Sky (2020)
 Wonder Woman 1984 (2020)
 Jingle Jangle: A Christmas Journey (2020)
 The Tomorrow War (2021)
 Marakkar: Arabikadalinte Simham (2021)
 Army of the Dead (2021)
 A Boy Called Christmas (2021)
 The Matrix: Resurrections (2021)
 Spider-Man: No Way Home (2021)
 Don't Look Up (2021)
 Tom and Jerry (2021)
 Dexter: New Blood (2021-2022)
 Sheba: Hope Reef (2021)
 No Time To Die (2021)
 The Suicide Squad (2021)
 The King's Man (2021)
 Venom: Let There Be Carnage (2021)
 Red Notice (2021)
 Flora & Ulysses (2021)
 The Boys (2019-2022)
 RRR (2022)
 Ms. Marvel (2022)
 Moon Knight (2022)
 The Sandman (2022)
 12 Surprising Hollywood Jobs You Never Knew Existed (2022)
 Fantastic Beasts: A Natural History (2022)
 Downton Abbey: A New Era (2022)
 Beast (2022)
 Men (2022)
 Moonfall (2022)
 Lyle, Lyle, Crocodile (2022)
 Doctor Strange in the Multiverse of Madness (2022)
 The School for Good and Evil (2022)
 Slumberland (2022)
 Thor: Love and Thunder (2022)
 Fantastic Beasts: The Secrets of Dumbledore (2022)
 The Guardians of the Galaxy Holiday Special (2022)
 1899 (2022)
 White Noise (2022)
 Glass Onion: A Knives Out Mystery (2022)
 65 (2023)
 Shazam! Fury of the Gods (2023)

Upcoming

 Peter Pan & Wendy (2023)
 Guardians of the Galaxy Vol. 3 (2023)
 Barbie (2023)
 The Little Mermaid (2023)
 Wonka (2023)
 Coyote vs. Acme (2023)
 Imaginary Friends (2024)
 Fantastic Beasts 4 (TBC)
 Fantastic Beasts 5 (TBC)
 Ladies' Night (TBC)
 Beetle Boy (TBC)

See also
 The Mill
 Industrial Light & Magic
 Sony Pictures Imageworks
 Animal Logic
 Pacific Data Images
 Blue Sky Studios
 Wētā FX
 Wētā Workshop
 Rhythm & Hues
 Digital Domain
 Moving Picture Company (MPC)
 DNEG
 Image Engine

References

External links
 
Wired article on the company

Visual effects companies
Mass media companies established in 1986
Best Visual Effects Academy Award winners
Computer animation
British animation studios
Special effects companies
Television and film post-production companies
Film production companies of the United Kingdom
1986 establishments in the United Kingdom